Babajide Saheed "Jide" Awobona  (born 9 February 1985) is a Nigerian actor, scriptwriter and filmmaker. He was born and raised in Lagos but hails from Ogun State. He gained popularity for his role as Sam in the sitcom Jenifa's Diary.

Early life 
Jide Awobona was born on 9 February 1985 in Lagos state, Nigeria. He is, however, a native of Ogun state, Nigeria.

Education 
Jide Awobona had his primary education at Wesley Memorial Primary School in Lagos. He had his secondary education at Amuwo Odofin Secondary School, after which he got his Bachelor of Arts degree in Mass Communications from Olabisi Onabanjo University in Ogun State.

Career 
Jide Awobona started his acting career in 2002, the same year he started his acting training with Jovies Perfection Press. His career kicked off in 2003 when he played a major role in the popular Nigerian TV drama series Super Story, Last Honor. Since then, has starred and produced several Nigeria films. He was nominated for best Actor in Leading role (Yoruba) by BON awards in 2020.

Selected filmography 

 Jenifa's Diary (2013)
 The Bunglers (2017)
 Convicted (2019)
 Olopa Olorun (2019)
 Alimi (2021)
 Akaba (2021)
 Clock (2019)
 Olokun (2021)
 The Event (2017)
 Olawura (alongside Tierny Olalere)

Awards and nominations

See also 

 List of Yoruba people
 List of Nigerian actors

References 

Nigerian male film actors
Yoruba filmmakers
Living people
1985 births
Yoruba actors
Nigerian male television actors
Olabisi Onabanjo University alumni